Thieves (German:Diebe) is a 1928 German silent film directed by Domenico Gambino and Edmund Heuberger and starring Hellen Allan, William Dieterle and Domenico Gambino.

The film's art direction was by August Rinaldi.

Cast
 Hellen Allan 
 William Dieterle 
 Domenico Gambino

References

Bibliography
 Bock, Hans-Michael & Bergfelder, Tim. The Concise CineGraph. Encyclopedia of German Cinema. Berghahn Books, 2009.

External links

1928 films
Films of the Weimar Republic
Films directed by Domenico Gambino
Films directed by Edmund Heuberger
German silent feature films
German black-and-white films